Dictyna hamifera is spider species found in Finland and Russia.

See also 
 List of Dictynidae species

References 

Dictynidae
Spiders of Europe
Spiders of Russia
Spiders described in 1872